La provinciale can refer to:

 La provinciale (1953 film), a 1953 Italian film (English title The Wayward Wife)
 La provinciale (1981 film), a 1981 French-Swiss film